Al HaNissim alternatively V'al HaNissim ("[and] on the miracles") is an addition to the Amidah and Birkat Hamazon on Hanukkah and Purim. On both holidays, it starts off with a short paragraph, beginning with the words for which it is named. After that, each holiday has a unique paragraph, describing the events for which that day is celebrated.

Text of the Prayer 
The standard Ashkenazi Orthodox text of the prayer is as follows:

The source of Al HaNissim
A prayer for the miracles is already mentioned in the Tosefta which indicates that on Hanukkah and Purim they say "a kind of event" in the confessional blessing of the eighteenth prayer. The exact wording "on the miracles" is not mentioned in the Tosefta (but "the kind of event") and even the Talmuds when they refer to prayer indicate "the kind of event". Probably the first to explicitly mention the words "Al HaNissim" is Rabbi Achai Mishbaha in the book of queries and its full version is found for the first time in the order of Rabbi Amram Gaon and Siddur RSG.

Al HaNissim on Yom Ha'atzmaut
Various rabbis endorsed the recitation of Al Hanisim on Yom Ha'atzmaut, and even penned unique versions of this prayer, although this practice is not universally accepted. The first to publish a version of Al Hanisim for Yom Ha'atzmaut was Rabbi Ezra Zion Melamed.

External links
 rabbi Eliezer Melamed, Al Ha-nisim in Peninei Halakha.

References

 

Hanukkah
Purim
Hebrew words and phrases in Jewish prayers and blessings